Ben Donaldson is an Australian former professional rugby league footballer who played in the 2000s. An alumnus of St. Joseph's Nudgee College, he played for the Newcastle Knights from 2000 to 2001.

References

1979 births
Living people
Australian rugby league players
Newcastle Knights players
People from Queensland
Place of birth missing (living people)
Rugby articles needing expert attention
Rugby league hookers